A media conglomerate, media group, or media institution is a company that owns numerous companies involved in mass media enterprises, such as music, television, radio, publishing, motion pictures, theme parks, or the Internet. According to the magazine The Nation, "Media conglomerates strive for policies that facilitate their control of the markets around the world."

Terminology
A conglomerate is a large company composed of a number of companies (subsidiaries) engaged in generally unrelated businesses.

Some media conglomerates use their access in multiple areas to share various kinds of content such as: news, video and music, between users. The media sector's tendency to consolidate has caused formerly diversified companies to appear less diverse to prospective investors in comparison with similar companies that are traded publicly and privately. Therefore, the term media group may also be applied, however, it has not yet replaced the more traditional term.

Criticism 

Critics have accused the large media conglomerates of dominating the media and using unfair practices. During a protest in November 2007, critics such as Jesse Jackson spoke out against consolidation of the media. This can be seen in the news industry, where corporations refuse to publicize information that would be harmful to their interests. Because some corporations do not publish any material that criticizes them or their interests, media conglomerates have been criticized for limiting free speech or not protecting free speech. These practices are also suspected of contributing to the merging of entertainment and news (sensationalism) at the expense of the coverage of serious issues. They are also accused of being a leading force behind the standardization of culture (see globalization, Americanization) and are frequently criticized by groups that perceive news organizations as being biased toward special interests of the owners.

Because there are fewer independent media, there is less diversity in news and entertainment and therefore less competition. This can result in the reduction of different points of view as well as vocalization about different issues. There is also a lack of ethnic and gender diversity as a majority of those in media are white, middle-class men. There is a concern that their views are being shared disproportionately more than other groups, such as women and ethnic minorities. Women and minorities also have less ownership of media.  Women have less than 7 percent of TV and radio licenses, and minorities have around 7 percent of radio licenses and 3 percent of TV licenses.

Examples by country

In the 2022 Forbes Global 2000 list, Comcast is America's largest media conglomerate, in terms of revenue, with The Walt Disney Company, Paramount Global, Warner Bros. Discovery, and Fox Corporation completing the top five.

In 1984, fifty independent media companies owned the majority of media interests within the United States. By 2011, 90% of the United States's media was controlled by six media conglomerates: GE/Comcast (NBC, Universal), News Corp (Fox News, Wall Street Journal, New York Post), Disney (ABC, ESPN, Pixar), Viacom (MTV, BET, Paramount Pictures), Time Warner (CNN, HBO, Warner Bros.), and CBS (Showtime, NFL.com).

Between 1941 and 1975, several laws that restricted channel ownership within radio and television were enacted in order to maintain unbiased and diverse media. However under the Reagan administration, Congress and the Federal Communications Commission, then led by FCC Chairman Mark S. Fowler, began a concerted deregulation over the years 1981 and 1985. The number of television stations a single entity can own increased from seven to 12 stations.

The industry continued to deregulate with enactment of the Telecommunications Act of 1996. Signed by President Bill Clinton on 8 February 1996, it was considered by the FCC to be the "first major overhaul of telecommunications law in almost 62 years". In the radio industry, the 40-station ownership cap was lifted, leading to an unprecedented amount of consolidation. Since this period, Clear Channel Communications grew from 40 stations to 1200 stations, in all 50 states, while Viacom grew to owning 180 stations across 41 markets.

As media consolidation grew, some in the nation began to speculate how it might negatively impact society at large. In the case of Minot, North Dakota, the concerns regarding media consolidation is realized. On 18 January 2002, a train containing hazardous chemicals derailed in the middle of the night, exposing countless Minot residents to toxic waste. Upon trying to get out an emergency broadcast, the Minot police were unable to reach anyone. They were instead forwarded to the same automated message, as all the broadcast stations in Minot were single-handedly owned by Clear Channel Communications. As the FCC reviews media ownership rules, broadcasters continued to petition it for the elimination of all rules, while those who are against this easing would often cite the incident in Minot as how consolidation could be harmful.

Canada, Australia, the Philippines, and New Zealand also experience the concentration of multiple media enterprises in a few companies. This concentration is an ongoing concern for the Canadian Radio-television and Telecommunications Commission, the Australian Communications and Media Authority, the Philippine National Telecommunications Commission, and New Zealand's Broadcasting Standards Authority. Other countries that have large media conglomerates with impacts on the world include: Japan, Germany, the United Kingdom, Italy, France, China, and Brazil. Media conglomerates outside of the United States include Fujisankei Communications Group (Fuji Media Holdings), Yomiuri Shimbun Holdings, Hubert Burda Media, ITV, ProSiebenSat.1, Mediaset, Axel Springer, JCDecaux, China Central Television, Alibaba Group, ABS-CBN Corporation, GMA Network, Inc., TV5 Network, Inc., Viva Entertainment, Asahi Shimbun Company, Grupo Globo, Baidu, and Bertelsmann.

United States

Notes:

International

See also
 Media imperialism
 Media proprietor
 Multinational corporation
 Lists of corporate assets

References

Concentration of media ownership
Types of business entity
Mass media companies